A Thames sailing barge is a type of commercial sailing boat once common on the River Thames in London. The flat-bottomed barges with a shallow draught and leeboards, were perfectly adapted to the Thames Estuary, with its shallow waters and narrow tributary rivers. The larger barges were seaworthy vessels, and were the largest sailing vessel to be handled by just two men.

The  average size was about 120 tons and they carried  of canvas sail in six working sails. The mainsail was loose-footed and set up with a sprit, and was brailed to the mast when not needed. It is sheeted to a horse, as are the foresails so need no attention when going about. The topsail was the main working sail in heavy weather, the upper reaches of the rivers and constricted harbours. It is controlled from the deck by halliards, in-hauls and sheets. The mizzen boom is sheeted down to the rudder- assisting the helm. The masts are mounted in tabernacles so they can be lowered to shoot bridges with little loss of headway. The bowsprit where fitted could be 'topped' where space was limited.

List of Thames barges sailing in the 110th Medway match 2018

  (1929)
  (1908)
  (1906)
  (1898)
  (1900)
  (1895)
  (1931)
  (1902)
  (1892)
  (1898)
  (1922)
  (1929)
  (1926)

List of Thames barges on the National Historic Ships list

Atrato:(1898):
Convoy:(1900): not active 
Dawn:(1897) :
Decima:(1899) 
Dinah:(1887) :
Edith May:(1906) :
Fertile: (1935):
Fraternity:(1902) : not active 
Greta :(1892) : National Historic Fleet
Lady Jean:(1926) :
Lady Daphne:(1923) :
May:(1891) :   National Historic Fleet
Nellie:(1901) :
Olive May:(1920) : not active 
Orinoco:(1895) :
Phoenician:(1922) : not active 
Scone:(1919) :
Seagull ll:(1901) :   National Historic Fleet
Tollesbury:(1901):
Vicunia:(1912) : not active 
Westmoreland: (1900) :
Wilfred:(1926) :

List of Thames barges illustrated by images on Commons

A
  (1929)
 Alice (1954) 
  (1908) 
B
 Beric (1896) 
C
 Cabby (1928) 
  (1906) 
 Celtic (1903) 
  (Essex)(1895) 
 Centaur (Rochester)(1898) 
 Cygnet (1881) 
D
 Decima (1899) 
E
 Edith May (1906) 
  (1898) 
 Ethel Ada (1903) 
G
 George Smeed (1882) 
 Gladys (1901) 
 Greta (1892) 
H
 Henry (1904) 
 Hydrogen (1906) 
I
  (1900) 
 Kitty (1895)
L
 Lady Daphne (1923) 
  (1931)
M
 Maria Hope 
  (1902) 
 Melissa (1899) 
  (1892) 
N
  (1898) 
P
 Pamlinda 
  (1922) 
R
 Raybel (1920) 
  (1924) 
S
 Sherwin  
 Spartan (1895) 
T
  (1906) 
 Thistle (1895) 
V
 Vigilant (1904) 
W
 Whippet of London 1905) 
  (1925) 
 William and Ann 
 (1898)
X
 Xylonite (1926)

List of Thames barges sailing built in 2019
 Blue Mermaid (2019)
Snark (2016-9)

See also
 Hibernia (1906)

References
Notes

References

External links

 Thames Sailing Barge Trust
 Mersea museum barge database (6616 records)
 Sailing Barge Association (21 racing barges)
 Society for Sailing Barge Research active barges 2007 (60 records)
 Thames sailing barge parade 2017 (60 records)
 Thames Barge Match with Nick Gates 2016 (video)
 Thames barge sailing matches 2015 race results (16 barges)
 Whitstable:Simple Guide to the Thames Barge(22 barges in detail+other names)

Thames sailing barges
Sailing barges